The monastery of Santo Domingo Real, located in the city of Toledo, in Castile-La Mancha, Spain, is a convent founded in 1364 by the noblewoman Inés García de Meneses, daughter of García Suárez de Meneses and María Fernández Barroso, after being widowed by Sancho de Velasco.

History 
It has been an enclosed convent since its beginnings and the first in the city founded by the Dominican nuns. In it María de Castilla professed. Maria was the daughter of King Peter of Castile and his lover Teresa of Ayala. Teresa was the daughter of Diego Gómez de Toledo and his wife Inés de Ayala, chancellor Pero López de Ayala's sister.

The monastery preserves in its archives numerous documents including letters of the king Peter's descendants since it became a "place of memory" for the king.

It was declared bien de interés cultural the June 15, 1934.

References

Bibliography

External links 

 Official State Gazette (BOE) where date of declaration of bien de interés cultural is mentioned

Bien de Interés Cultural landmarks in the City of Toledo
Roman Catholic churches in Toledo, Spain
Nunneries in Spain
Dominican monasteries in Spain
Dominican monasteries of nuns
Religious buildings and structures completed in 1364